The 126th Ohio General Assembly comprised the state legislature of the U.S. state of Ohio. The Ohio House of Representatives is the lower house of the Ohio General Assembly. Every two years, all of the house seats come up for election. The 126th General Assembly was in session in 2005 and 2006. The party distribution was 61 Republicans and 38 Democrats.

Make-up of the 126th General Assembly

Leadership

Majority leadership

Minority leadership

Members of the Ohio House of Representatives, 126th General Assembly

See also
Ohio House of Representatives membership, 125th General Assembly

References
Ohio House of Representatives
2004 election results from Ohio Secretary of State

House 126
2005 in Ohio
2006 in Ohio
126th General Assembly